Seachange were a band from Nottingham, England, that played a mixture of melodic folk and pop with a strong influence of alternative rock.

History
Seachange formed in Nottingham in 1999. They were the first British band to be taken on the roster of American indie-label Matador Records within five years. In Europe they were signed to Glitterhouse Records.

In late March 2007, the band announced their decision to split, citing external pressures and increasing involvement with other projects. Also mentioned was the fact that several members where working on a new project(a band called Dearest) together.

Post breakup
Daniel, David, Neil and Simon went on to form Dearest in 2007. A final collection of Seachange songs, The Stars Whiteout, was released digitally in August 2008.

Critical reception
Pitchfork, reviewing the 2004 album Lay of the Land, found the album mixed and gave it a rating of 5.6. AllMusic gave the album 3 out of 5 stars, saying it was interesting and powerful, but could do with more focus and refinement. Drowned in Sound had a higher opinion, rating it 7, saying its songs 'inspire the imagination'.

Line-up

 Dan Eastop (vocals)
 Adam Cormack (guitar)
 Dave Gray (guitar)
 James Vyner (bass)
 Neil Wells (multiple instruments)
 Simon Aldcroft (drums)

Alumni:
 Johanna Woodnutt (violin)

Discography

Studio albums
Lay of the Land (2004, Matador)
On Fire, With Love (2006, for Europe: Glitterhouse)
The Stars Whiteout (2008, A Is For Artist) digital

Live albums
Disband in Bonn 2007 (2007, Glitterhouse)

Singles
 "A vs. Co10" (2004, Gringo Records)
 "Superfuck" (2004, Radiate)
 "News from Nowhere" (2004, Matador)

EPs
 Glitterball EP (2003, Matador)
 Fields, Chaos and Brown (2006, A is for Artist)

References

External links
Seachange on MySpace Music

English rock music groups
Musical groups from Nottingham
Matador Records artists
Glitterhouse Records artists